Novoye Vremya was a Russian newspaper published in St. Petersburg from 1868 to 1917. Until 1869 it came out five times a week; thereafter it came out every day, and from 1881 there were both morning and evening editions. In 1891 a weekly illustrated supplement was added.

The newspaper began as a liberal publication, and in 1872 published an editorial celebrating the appearance in Russian of the first volume of Karl Marx's Das Kapital, but after Aleksey Suvorin took it over it acquired a reputation as a servile supporter of the government, in part because of the antisemitic and reactionary articles of Victor Burenin. "'The motto of Suvorin's Novoye Vremya,' wrote Russia's greatest satirist Saltykov-Shchedrin, 'is to go inexorably forward, but through the anus.'" Nevertheless, it became one of Russia's most popular newspapers, with a circulation reaching 60,000 copies, and published important writers, most famously Anton Chekhov until he broke with Suvorin in the late 1890s; furthermore, Suvorin was "the first to raise the salaries in the newspaper world and to improve the working conditions of the journalists." The paper was looked down on by the liberal intelligentsia of the early twentieth century and despised by the Bolsheviks, and the day after the October Revolution, Lenin shut it down.

The newspaper should not be confused with the current magazine of the same name, founded in 1943, or with the current Ukrainian newspaper of the same name.

Publishers

 A. K. Krikor and N. N. Yumatov (1868—1872)
 F. N. Ustryalov (1872—1873)
 Osip Notovich (1873—1874)
 K. V. Trubnikov (1874—1876)
 Aleksey Suvorin (1876—1912)
 the A. S. Suvorin Company (1912—1917)

References

External links
Saint Petersburg Encyclopedia article
 "Novoye Vremya" digital archives in "Newspapers on the web and beyond" , the digital resource of the National Library of Russia

Publications established in 1868
Publications disestablished in 1917
Newspapers published in the Russian Empire
Mass media in Saint Petersburg